This is a list of creeks of The Bahamas in alphabetical order for islands that have creeks.  There is only one river in The Bahamas, the Goose River in Central Andros. There are also many tidal creeks, which resemble rivers.

In March 2018, waves breaking over cliffs near the Glass Window Bridge in Eleuthera caused a flow of water across the island that washed out the Queens Highway, and was temporarily called a new river.

Andros Island
The river and creeks on Andros Island include the following:

Eleuthera Island

There is one creek on Eleuthera Island.   There is a town in South Eleuthera that is named Deep Creek.
Starve Creek,

Berry Islands
There is one known creek on Berry Islands:
Stafford Creek, Berry Islands,  (??)

Abaco Islands

The Abaco Islands have following tidal creeks:

Mangrove Cay
Miller Creek,

Grand Bahama
There are one tidal creek and one channel in Grand Bahama:
Thrift Harbor Creek, tidal creek, East Grand Bahama, 
Hawksbill Creek, channel, West Grand Bahama,

See also
 List of rivers of the Americas

References

Bahamas
Rivers

Baham